Trichobius is a genus of bat flies in the family Streblidae. There are more than 60 described species in Trichobius.

Species
These 69 species belong to the genus Trichobius:

 Trichobius adamsi Augustson, 1943
 Trichobius affinis Wenzel, 1976
 Trichobius anducei Guerrero, 1998
 Trichobius angulatus Wenzel, 1976
 Trichobius assimilis Wenzel, 1976
 Trichobius bequaerti Wenzel, 1966
 Trichobius bilobus Wenzel, 1976
 Trichobius brennani Wenzel, 1966
 Trichobius caecus Edwards, 1918
 Trichobius cernyi Peterson & Hurka, 1974
 Trichobius cognatus Peterson & Hurka, 1974
 Trichobius corynorhini Cockerell, 1910
 Trichobius costalimai Guimaraes, 1938
 Trichobius diaemi Wenzel, 1976
 Trichobius diphyllae Wenzel, 1966
 Trichobius dominicanus Peterson & Hurka, 1974
 Trichobius dugesii Townsend, 1891
 Trichobius dugesiodes Wenzel, 1966
 Trichobius dunni Wenzel, 1966
 Trichobius dusbabeki Peterson & Hurka, 1974
 Trichobius dybasi Wenzel, 1966
 Trichobius ethophallus Wenzel, 1976
 Trichobius flagellatus Wenzel, 1976
 Trichobius frequens Peterson & Hurka, 1974
 Trichobius furmani Wenzel, 1966
 Trichobius galei Wenzel, 1966
 Trichobius handleyi Wenzel, 1976
 Trichobius hirsutulus Bequaert, 1933
 Trichobius hispidus Wenzel, 1976
 Trichobius hoffmannae Guerrero & Morales-Malacara, 1996
 Trichobius imitator Wenzel, 1976
 Trichobius intermedius Peterson & Hurka, 1974
 Trichobius joblingi Wenzel, 1966
 Trichobius johnsonae Wenzel, 1966
 Trichobius jubatus Wenzel, 1976
 Trichobius keenani Wenzel, 1966
 Trichobius leionotus Wenzel, 1976
 Trichobius lionycteridis Wenzel, 1966
 Trichobius lonchophyllae Wenzel, 1966
 Trichobius longipes (Rudow, 1871)
 Trichobius longipilus Wenzel, 1976
 Trichobius machadoallisoni Guerrero, 1998
 Trichobius macrophylli Wenzel, 1966
 Trichobius macroti Peterson & Hurka, 1974
 Trichobius major Coquillett, 1899
 Trichobius mendezi Wenzel, 1966
 Trichobius neotropicus Peterson & Hurka, 1974
 Trichobius pallidus (Curran, 1934)
 Trichobius parasiticus Gervais, 1844
 Trichobius parasparsus Wenzel, 1976
 Trichobius persimilis Wenzel, 1976
 Trichobius petersoni Wenzel, 1976
 Trichobius phyllostomae Kessel, 1925
 Trichobius phyllostomus Guerrero, 1998
 Trichobius propinquus Wenzel, 1976
 Trichobius pseudotruncatus Jobling, 1939
 Trichobius robynae Peterson & Hurka, 1974
 Trichobius silvicolae Wenzel, 1976
 Trichobius sparsus Kessel, 1925
 Trichobius sphaeronotus Jobling, 1939
 Trichobius strictisternus Wenzel, 1976
 Trichobius tiptoni Wenzel, 1976
 Trichobius truncatus Kessel, 1925
 Trichobius tuttlei Wenzel, 1976
 Trichobius uniformis Curran, 1935
 Trichobius urodermae Wenzel, 1966
 Trichobius vampyropis Wenzel, 1966
 Trichobius wenzeli Peterson & Hurka, 1974
 Trichobius yunkeri Wenzel, 1966

References

Further reading

 

Articles created by Qbugbot
Hippoboscoidea genera